John R. Plumer is a New Hampshire politician, and currently serves in the New Hampshire House of Representatives.

References

Living people
Year of birth missing (living people)
Republican Party members of the New Hampshire House of Representatives
21st-century American politicians